Vignan's Institute Of Information Technology is one of the engineering institutions run by the Vignan group of Guntur. It was established in 2002 to offer undergraduate (BTech) (college code:L3) courses in engineering and technology. It is situated in Duvvada, a suburban region of Visakhapatnam, India.

Library facility
This college has a good library named vignan dhara it has all volumes related to all study departments

References 

Vignan's Institute Of Information Technology
VIIT declared autonomous, to offer new job-oriented courses
https://www.thehansindia.com/posts/index/Andhra-Pradesh/2018-09-20/Vignans-Institute-of-Information-Technology-holds-awareness-programme-on-employability/413032 Vignan's Institute of Information Technology holds awareness programme on employability
"Yuvtarang 2k17 to be held at Duvvada on January 7, 8"

Engineering colleges in Andhra Pradesh
Universities and colleges in Visakhapatnam
2002 establishments in Andhra Pradesh
Educational institutions established in 2002